Yaadgaar may refer to:

 Yaadgaar, a 1970 Hindi film
 Yaadgaar, a 1984 Hindi-language Indian film